Arenarba is a genus of moths of the family Noctuidae. The genus was erected by Emilio Berio in 1950.

Species
Arenarba arenacea (Hampson, 1893) Sri Lanka
Arenarba destituta (Moore, [1884]) Sri Lanka, to Yemen (Socotra)

References

Acontiinae